Statistics of Japanese Regional Leagues in the 1976 season.

Champions list

League standings

Kanto

Hokushinetsu

Tokai

Kansai

Chūgoku

Kyushu

1976
Japanese Regional Leagues
3
Japanese Regional Leagues